Kayuta Lake is located northwest of Bardwell Mill, New York. Kayuta Lake Campground is located by the Black River inlet. Fish species present in the lake are smallmouth bass, pickerel, white sucker, rock bass, yellow perch, bluegill, and black bullhead. There is a carry down access on the north shore located on State Dam Road.

References 

Lakes of New York (state)
Lakes of Oneida County, New York